A longevity risk is any potential risk attached to the increasing life expectancy of pensioners and policy holders, which can eventually result in higher pay-out ratios than expected for many pension funds and insurance companies.

One important risk to individuals who are spending down savings is that they will live longer than expected, and thus exhaust their savings, dying in poverty or burdening relatives. This is also referred to as "outliving one's savings" or "outliving one's assets".

Individuals 

Individuals often underestimate longevity risk.  In the United States, most retirees do not expect to live past 85, but this is in fact the median conditional life expectancy for men at 65 (half of 65-year-old men will live to 85 or older, and more women will).

Low interest rates and declining returns exacerbating longevity risk 
The collapse in returns on government bonds is taking place against the backdrop of a protracted fall in returns for other core assets such as blue chip stocks, and, more importantly, a silent demographic shock. Factoring in the corresponding longevity risk, pension premiums could be raised significantly while disposable incomes stagnate and employees work longer years before retiring.

Bibliography
 Vincent Bazi & M. Nicolas J. Firzli, "1st annual World Pensions & Investments Forum", Revue Analyse Financière, Q2 2011, pp. 7–8
Thomas Crawford, Richard de Haan, & Chad Runchey, "Longevity risk quantification and management: a review of relevant literature", The Society of Actuaries, March 2008
 Gavin Jones, "Financial Aspects of Longevity Risk", Cass School International Conference on Longevity, 18 Feb. 2005

References

External links

General information
 Longevity risk transfer or reinsurance news and coverage
 List of longevity swap, reinsurance and risk transfer deals

 

Actuarial science
Pensions